See the list of places in Scotland for places in other counties.

This List of places in the Western Isles (na h-Eileanan Siar) is a list of links for any town, village, hamlet, island, port, river, harbour, historic house, nature reserve and other place of interest in the na h-Eileanan Siar (Western Isles) council area of Scotland.

A
Adabroc (Adabrog)
Aignish (Aiginis)
Aird (Àird an Rubha)
Allasdale (Allathasdal)
Ardvay

B
Balallan (Baile Ailein)
Baleshare (Am Baile Sear)
Balivanich (Baile a' Mhanaich)
Ballantrushal (Baile an Truiseil)
Barpa Langass (Barpa Langais)
Barra (Barraigh), Barra Airport (Port-adhair Bharraigh), Barra Head (Beàrnaraigh Cheann Bharraigh),  Bruernish (Bruthairnais), Barra Isles
Barvas (Barabhas)
Bayble (Pabail)
Bayhead (Ceann a' Bhàigh)
Benbecula (Beinn nam Fadhla), Benbecula Airport (Port-adhair Bheinn na Fadhla)
Berneray (Beàrnaraigh)
Borve (Borgh)
Bragar (Bràgar)
Breaclete (Breacleit)
Butt of Lewis (Rubha Robhanais)

C
Callanish (Calanais), Callanish Stones (Clachan Chalanais), Callanish VIII
Calvay (Calbhaigh)
Carinish (Càirinis)
Carloway (Càrlabhagh)
Castlebay (Bàgh a' Chaisteil)
Cille Bharra
Clach an Trushal (Clach an Truiseil)
Clisham (An Cliseam)
Craigstrom (Creagastrom)
Creagorry (Creag Ghoraidh)

D
Daliburgh (Dalabrog)
Dun Carloway (Dùn Chàrlabhaigh)

E
Eilean Chearstaidh (Eilean Kerstay)
Eilean Dòmhnuill
Eriskay (Èirisgeigh)

F
Fiaraigh
Finsbay (Fionnasbhagh)
Fir Bhrèige
Flodabay (Fleòideabhagh)
Flodaigh
Flodday
Fuaigh Beag
Fuaigh Mòr
Fuday (Fùideigh)

G
Geocrab (Geòcrab)
Gighay (Gioghaigh)
Gravir (Grabhair)
Great Bernera (Beàrnaraigh Ùig)
Grimsay (Griomasaigh)
Grimsay, South East Benbecula (Griomasaigh)

H
Habost (Tàbost)
Harris (Na Hearadh)
Hellisay (Theiliseigh)
Hushinish (Hùisinis)

I
Iochdar (An t-Ìochdar)

K
Kisimul Castle (Caisteal Chiseamail)

L
Laxdale (Lacasdal)
Leverburgh (An Tòb)
Lewis (Leòdhas), Lewis and Harris (Leòdhas agus na Hearadh), Lews Castle (Caisteal Leòdhais)
Lickisto (Liceasto)
Lingeidh (Lingeigh)
Lingerbay (Lingearabhagh)
Liniclate (Lìonacleit)
Loch Ròg
Lochboisdale (Loch Baghasdail)
Lochmaddy (Loch nam Madadh)

M
Manish (Mànais)
Mingulay (Miughalaigh)
Muldoanich (Maol Dòmhnaich)

N
Newtonferry (Port nan Long)
North Uist (Uibhist a Tuath)

P
Pabbay (Pabaigh)
Pobull Fhinn

R
Rèinigeadal
Rockall (Rocabarraigh), Rockall Bank
Rodel (Roghadal)
Ruabhal (Ruaidheabhal)

S
Sandray (Sanndraigh)
Scalpay (Sgalpaigh)
Scarp
Scolpaig
Scolpaig Tower (Dùn Scolpaig)
Sollas (Solas)
Sound of Barra (Caolas na Barraigh)
Sound of Harris (Caolas na Hearadh)
South Uist (Uibhist a Deas)
St Kilda (Hiort)
Steinacleit
Stiomrabhaig
Stornoway (Steòrnabhagh), Stornoway Airport (Port-Adhair Steòrnabhagh)

T
Taransay (Tarasaigh)
Tarbert (An Tairbeart)
Tigharry (Taigh a' Ghearraidh)

U
Uineasan
Uist (Uibhist)

V
Vacsay (Bhacasaidh)
Valtos (Bhaltos)
Vatersay (Bhatarsaigh)

W
West Loch Tarbert (Loch A Siar)

See also
List of places in Scotland
List of islands of Scotland
List of Outer Hebrides

Geography of the Outer Hebrides
Lists of places in Scotland
Outer Hebrides
Populated places in Scotland
Ports and harbours of Scotland